Giacomo Casanova: Childhood and Adolescence , internationally released as Casanova: His Youthful Years, is a 1969 Italian comedy film directed by Luigi Comencini.  It tells the youth of Giacomo Casanova, who, after an unhappy childhood and early ecclesiastical activity in Venice, became an abbot and abandoned his vocation for the love of a countess. Despite the plot, more than a portrait of Casanova, the film is more of a vivid fresco of the Venetian society of the time.

Plot 
In 1742 in Venice, the young Giacomo Casanova is in a great trouble. A few years previously, in the seminary in Padua, Giacomo had experienced his first love, though he was destined to be a priest. While Giacomo now follows the  seminary, the young noble is to sneak into a  palace of beautiful girls and spend the night. One day, Giacomo falls in love with a beautiful countess, so he decides to abandon his studies to become a priest for being a daring libertine.

Cast 
Leonard Whiting: Giacomo Casanova 
Maria Grazia Buccella: Zanetta 
Lionel Stander: Don Tosello 
Raoul Grassilli: Don Gozzi 
Wilfrid Brambell: Malipiero 
Tina Aumont: Marcella 
Mario Scaccia: Dottor Zambelli 
Silvia Dionisio: Mariolina  
Senta Berger: Giulietta Cavamacchia   
Cristina Comencini: Angela Rosalba Mocenigo
Clara Colosimo: Giacomo Casanova's Grandma
Ennio Balbo: Mocenigo 
Evi Maltagliati: Contessa Serpieri  
Jacques Herlin: Monsieur Alexandre  
Umberto Raho: Il vescovo 
Linda Sini: Mother Teresa 
Gino Santercole: Baffo 
Gigi Reder: Salvatore

References

External links

1969 films
Commedia all'italiana
Films directed by Luigi Comencini
Italian comedy films
Films set in Venice
Films about Giacomo Casanova
Films set in the 18th century
Cultural depictions of Giacomo Casanova
Italian biographical films
Films with screenplays by Suso Cecchi d'Amico
1969 comedy films
Films scored by Fiorenzo Carpi
1960s Italian films